Farinopsis is a genus of flowering plants belonging to the family Rosaceae.

Its native range is Central Asia to Southwestern Siberia and Pakistan.

Species:
 Farinopsis salesoviana (Stephan) Chrtek & Soják

References

Rosaceae
Rosaceae genera